Olga Viktorovna Permyakova (born 12 April 1982 in Chelyabinsk, Russian SSR, Soviet Union) is a Russian ice hockey defender.

International career
Permyakova was selected for the Russia national women's ice hockey team in the 2002, 2006 and 2010 Winter Olympics. In 2002, she recorded one point in five games. In 2006, she played in three games without recording a point. In 2010, she had two assists in four games.. She also played in the qualifying tournament for the 2006 Olympics.

Permyakova has also appeared for Russia at seven IIHF Women's World Championships. Her first appearance came in 2004. She was a member of the team that won a bronze medal at the 2001 IIHF Women's World Championship.

Career statistics

International career

References

External links
Eurohockey.com Profile
Sports-Reference Profile

1982 births
Living people
Ice hockey players at the 2002 Winter Olympics
Ice hockey players at the 2006 Winter Olympics
Ice hockey players at the 2010 Winter Olympics
Olympic ice hockey players of Russia
Sportspeople from Chelyabinsk
Russian women's ice hockey defencemen
HC Tornado players